List of the terrorist actions against the Mourning of Muharram contain actions like kill, bodily harm or bombing or attack with a target of holding Mourning of Muharram.

List of actions 
The following is a list of terrorist incidents and arrests.

See also
List of Islamist terrorist attacks
List of terrorist incidents, 2014
List of terrorist incidents, 2015
List of wars and battles involving ISIL

References

Mourning of Muharram